The 2007 Tour de Pologne was held from September 9 to 15, 2007 in Poland. The race began with a very short team time trial in the streets of Warsaw, and its toughest stages were in the proximity of Jelenia Góra, as usual. In all, the race comprised seven stages.

Jersey progress chart

Stages

Stage 1 – September 9, 2007: Warsaw, 3 km. (TTT) 

The race jury ultimately decided that the severe conditions of the weather were unfair, and decided to award Lampre's Fabio Baldato with the leader's jersey but have all riders at the same time in the overall classification.

Stage 2 – September 10, 2007: Płońsk > Olsztyn, 203.6 km.

Stage 3 – September 11, 2007: Ostróda > Gdańsk, 192.3 km.

Stage 4 – September 12, 2007: Chojnice > Poznań, 242.3 km.

Stage 5 – September 13, 2007: Września > Świdnica, 264.5 km.

Stage 6 – September 14, 2007: Dzierżoniów > Jelenia Góra, 183.7 km.

Stage 7 – September 15, 2007: Jelenia Góra > Karpacz, 147.7 km.

General Standings

KOM Classification

Points Classification

Best Team

External links

Race website 

Tour de Pologne
2007
Tour de Pologne
September 2007 sports events in Europe